Prostanthera spinosa, commonly known as spiny mintbush,  is a  shrub that is endemic to south-eastern Australia. It has mauve to white flowers, spiny stems and aromatic foliage.

Description
The small leaves are thickly  hairy or with occasional hairs, mostly on the petiole. The leaves are darker on the upper surface, paler on the underside, smooth or with firm, spreading hairs below on the midrib and profusely covered with glands. Flowering occurs from July to December.

Taxonomy and naming
The species was formally described in 1855 by Victorian Government Botanist Ferdinand von Mueller, based on plant material collected from "rocky declivities in springs near the Grampians". The description was published in Hooker's Journal of Botany and Kew Garden Miscellany. The specific epithet (spinosa) is derived from the Latin spinosus meaning "thorny".

Distribution and habitat
Spiny mintbush occurs in  the Grampians in rocky locations on shallow, sandy soils. In South Australia it is found growing near watercourses mostly in loamy-sand over limestone or sandstone.

References 

spinosa
Flora of South Australia
Flora of Victoria (Australia)
Lamiales of Australia
Plants described in 1855
Taxa named by Ferdinand von Mueller